KSL Classifieds is a classified advertisements website covering northern Utah and nearby parts of Idaho and Wyoming. It is one of the largest classifieds sites in the U.S. and the only one to draw more users than Craigslist within its local market. It is operated by Deseret Digital Media, a subsidiary of Deseret Management Corporation, a holding company owned by the Church of Jesus Christ of Latter-day Saints (LDS Church).

History 

KSL Classifieds was launched in 2000 by broadcaster KSL TV and KSL Newsradio, despite the misgivings of KSL executives who resisted the idea of making ads free for individual users, and despite the fact it would be competing with paid classifieds in the Deseret News, which was also owned by the LDS Church. It claims to be the first broadcast site to offer free classified ads, and one of the first to stream content from television and radio. As its launch predated Craigslist's expansion into Utah by four years, it was able to use the network effect to build its online presence during that time.

Criticisms 

Gun control activists raised concerns in 2011 that KSL Classifieds did a disservice to its community by providing a marketplace for sellers who were not licensed dealers, as such sellers need not perform background checks on buyers. A 2011 report from the office of New York City mayor Michael Bloomberg found that KSL Classifieds had more gun listings than any other general-purpose online marketplace, exceeded only by online marketplaces that specialize in guns. KSL Classifieds discontinued gun listings in the wake of the Sandy Hook Elementary School shooting.

References

External links 
 

Online marketplaces of the United States
Economy of Utah